The Tayacian is a Palaeolithic stone tool industry that is a variant of the Mousterian. It was first identified as distinct by Abbé Breuil from the site of La Micoque in Les-Eyzies-de-Tayac although since then the cave at Fontéchevade has become the "reference site for this industry".

Tools from this culture have been excavated in a stratigraphic column in the Syria area.

References

Archaeological cultures of West Asia
Archaeological cultures of Europe
Paleolithic cultures of Asia
Paleolithic cultures of Europe
Archaeological cultures in France
Archaeological cultures in Syria
Middle Paleolithic
Lithics
Mousterian